VVR may refer to:

 See LWR for VVR, the Russian class of nuclear reactor
 See List of German transport associations for Verkehrsverbund Rottweil.
 See VERITAS Software for Veritas Volume Replicator